Mohamed Machou (born 25 June 1958) is an Algerian handball player. He competed in the men's tournament at the 1980 Summer Olympics.

References

External links
 

1958 births
Living people
Algerian male handball players
Olympic handball players of Algeria
Handball players at the 1980 Summer Olympics
Place of birth missing (living people)
21st-century Algerian people